APEC New Zealand 2021 was the year-long hosting of Asia-Pacific Economic Cooperation (APEC) meetings in New Zealand from December 2020 until November 2021. Due to the COVID-19 pandemic, it was the second consecutive year that all of the meetings were held virtually, including the culminating Economic Leaders' Meeting.

This was New Zealand's second time hosting an APEC meeting, having hosted one in 1999.

After the virtual summit held on 12 November 2021, the APEC leaders issued the Auckland Declaration.

Theme
The official theme of the APEC New Zealand 2021 is "Join, Work, Grow. Together." It was chosen to reflect the Asia Pacific region's ability of work together through the COVID-19 pandemic.

Logo
APEC New Zealand 2021 logo is an image of New Zealand's national plant, Alsophila dealbata, known locally as silver fern.

Events

Attendees

This was the first APEC Meeting for United States President Joe Biden, Peruvian President Pedro Castillo, Malaysian Prime Minister Ismail Sabri Yaakob and Japanese Prime Minister Fumio Kishida after their inaugurations and appointments on January 20, 2021, July 28, 2021, August 21, 2021 and October 4, 2021, respectively. It was also the first APEC meeting for Nguyễn Xuân Phúc as Vietnamese President, who took office on April 5, 2021 and attended the previous year as Vietnamese Prime Minister. It was also the last APEC meeting for Chilean President Sebastian Piñera, South Korean President Moon Jae-in, Philippine President Rodrigo Duterte, Hong Kong Chief Executive Carrie Lam, and Australian Prime Minister Scott Morrison who stepped down on 11 March 2022 (following the 2021 Chilean election), 9 May 2022 (following the 2022 South Korean presidential election), 30 June 2022 (following the 2022 Philippine presidential election and the inauguration of Bongbong Marcos), 1 July 2022 (following the 2022 Hong Kong election), and 23 May 2022 (following the 2022 Australian federal election), respectively.

One president who did not attend was Mexican President Andrés Manuel López Obrador. López Obrador was represented by his Minister of Economy Tatiana Clouthier.

Notes

References

External links
 

2021 in economics
Economy of New Zealand
Diplomatic conferences in New Zealand
2021 in international relations
2021 conferences
2021
2021 in New Zealand
Events affected by the COVID-19 pandemic